, also known as The Japanese School of Toronto Shokokai Inc., is a school that provides specific Japanese educational curricula, located in the downtown area of Toronto, Ontario, Canada. It was established by the Toronto Shokokai Inc. The school borrows McMurrich Junior Public School building for preschool and elementary school level classes, and the connected Winona Drive Senior Public School building for middle school and high school level classes.

History
September 1973 - Opens as a Japanese language school.
May 1976 - Hoshu jugyo ko becomes an independent school.
April 1977 - Class for preschool level is established.
December 1977 - School anthem  is created
April 1978 - Class for high school level is established.

Student population
As of April 15, 2014:
Preschool: 88
Elementary school: 346
Middle school: 95
High school: 42

See also

 Japanese Canadians in the Greater Toronto Area
 Montreal Hoshuko School

References

External links
 Official site
 Official site of Toronto Shokokai Inc.

Asian-Canadian culture in Toronto
Educational institutions established in 1973
Japanese-Canadian culture
Supplementary Japanese schools
1973 establishments in Ontario

ja:トロント補習授業校